The 10 000 People Strong Grand Art Performance Celebrating the 70th Anniversary of the Workers' Party of Korea "Great Party, Rosy Korea" (Korean:  조선로동당창건 70돐경축 1만명대공연 《위대한 당, 찬란한 조선》) was a one-off artistic performance held on the 11th of October 2015 in celebration of the 70th anniversary of the ruling Workers' Party of Korea. The performance was originally meant to be hosted on the evening of the 10th of October, however, this was moved back a day due to wet weather.

The performance was held on a large floating stage in the middle of the Taedong River with the Tower of the Juche Idea as its backdrop. The audience was seating along the steps of the river as well as on seating in Kim Il-sung Square. The large stage was decorated with a large red flag baring the hammer, sickle and writing brush of the Workers' Party as well as a large LED display. On ether side of the stage, multi-colour dancing fountains

The show was directed by People's Artiste Ryang Chang-nam (Korean: 인민예술가 량창남) and was produced by O Yong-cheol, O Hung-chol and Ri Yun-ho (Korean: 오영철, 오훙철, 리윤호). The business team consisted of Department Director at the Ministry of Culture Kwon Hyok-bong (Korean: 권혁봉), Kim Hak-sun (Korean: 김학순) and Peoples' Artist Ryang Chang-nam (Korean: 인민예술가 량창남).

Artistic Program 
The performance was divided into two sections, with a total duration of over 3 hours.

Part 1

Part 2

Audience

Attendance 
The performance "Great Party, Rosy Korea" was attended by the then President of the Presidium of the Supreme People's Assembly Kim Yong-nam (Korean: 김영남) and the then Premier Pak Pong-ju (Korean: 박봉주), as well as key Party and state leaders. In addition to this, many delegations from various countries, foreign ministers from international organisations and foundations, foreign ambassadors and foreign guests were all invited to the performance along with members from the General Association of Korean Residents in Japan (the Chongryon) (Korean: 총련) and the chief of the Pyongyang mission of the Anti-Imperialist National Democratic Front.

Television 
The performance was broadcast on the state television station Korean Central Television a week or so after the performance. The reason for this delay was most likely the fact that the concert was never carried live to TV, but, instead was edited from multiple recordings of the concert including the rehearsal and debut. Unlike the DVD version, the television broadcast was instead split into two distinct sections; separated by a question and answer segment with those who recollect memories of the history of the Party. This Q&A was hosted by narrator Kim Jong-il Prize Laureate People's Actress Paek Sung Ran (Korean: 김정일상계관인 인민배우 백승란) and was most likely held during the intermission period. Following this, the interviewees perform a song.

See also 

 Arirang Mass Games

References

External links
 Grand Evening Gala for the 65th Anniversary of the Founding of the Worker's Party of Korea "Let's Prosper in the Era of the Worker's Party"

Art in North Korea
Propaganda in North Korea
North Korean culture